Kwun Tong On Tai is one of the 40 constituencies in the Kwun Tong District.

Created for the 2019 District Council elections, the constituency returns one district councillor to the Kwun Tong District Council, with an election every four years.

Kwun Tong On Tai loosely covers part of the public housing estates On Tai Estate, Shun Lee Estate and Shun On Estate. It has projected population of 20,739.

Councillors represented

Election results

2010s

References

Kwun Tong
Constituencies of Hong Kong
Constituencies of Kwun Tong District Council
2019 establishments in Hong Kong
Constituencies established in 2019